Kurtziella plumbea is a species of sea snail, a marine gastropod mollusk in the family Mangeliidae.

Description
The length of the shell attains 10 mm.

The small shell is yellowish, with on the body whorl a faint dark band in front of the suture and an obscure dark line at the periphery, with a dark flush on the siphonal canal. The shell containssix whorls, including a minute smooth protoconch followed by a minutely reticulated second whorl, and then by the adult sculpture. The suture is distinct, slightly appressed, the anal fasciole occupying the space between it and an angular shoulder. The axial sculpture consists of (on the penultimate whorl, 15) narrow, sharp, arcuate ribs extending from the suture over the periphery, with wider interspaces. There are also minute incremental lines roughening the spirals. The spiral sculpture consists of numerous minutely channeled grooves with wider flattish interspaces (the latter sometimes with a smaller median groove) covering the whole surface. The aperture is narrow, with a wide very shallow anal sulcus. The outer lip is thin, sharp, body erased. The columella is straight, axis pervious, gyrate. The siphonal canal is hardly differentiated.

Distribution
This marine species occurs off California, USA, and Pacific Mexico.

References

 W. O. Addicott. 1959. Late Pleistocene Invertebrates from Punta Cabras, Baja California, Mexico. American Museum Novitates 1925:1–33
 A. M. Keen. 1971. Sea Shells of Tropical West America 1-1064

External links
  Tucker, J.K. 2004 Catalog of recent and fossil turrids (Mollusca: Gastropoda). Zootaxa 682:1–1295.
 

plumbea
Gastropods described in 1843